Francis Saili (born 16 February 1991) is a New Zealand rugby union player, currently playing for French club Biarritz. He plays primarily as a centre, though he can also play wing. He is the younger brother of Blues loose forward Peter Saili.

Early life
Saili was born in Auckland and educated at St Peter's College where he played rugby in the school First XV. He was the captain in 2009. He represented New Zealand in schoolboy and global under-age tournaments. After leaving school he played for Auckland Marist.

Career
Saili was part of the New Zealand Under 20 team that won the Junior World Championship in Italy in 2011.

Saili started his professional rugby career in 2011, with a start in the ITM Cup for Auckland. In 2012, he commenced playing for the Blues in a match against the Stormers. In 2013, Saili made his debut for the All Blacks against Argentina in Hamilton. On 1 November 2014, he played for the Barbarians against Australia, scoring a try at Twickenham.

On 6 April 2015, it was announced that Saili would be joining Irish provincial side Munster on a two-year contract. He made his debut on 21 August 2015 in Munster's uncapped pre-season friendly loss to Irish rivals Connacht. Saili made his  full Munster debut on 13 September 2015, starting against Ospreys in the 2015–16 Pro12. He made his European Rugby Champions Cup debut on 14 November 2015, starting the opening 2015–16 pool game against Treviso. On 16 August 2016, it was announced that Saili would be out for 3–4 months following a surgical procedure on his shoulder.

On 26 December 2016, Saili made his return from the injury, coming on as a replacement for Jaco Taute in Munster's game against Leinster. On 14 January 2017, Saili scored the winning try in Munster's 12–14 away win against Glasgow Warriors, a win that secured Munster's place in the quarter-finals of the 2016–17 European Rugby Champions Cup. On 19 May 2017, it was announced that Saili would leave Munster at the end of the 2016–17 season. The following day, in what was his final appearance for Munster in Thomond Park, Saili scored a try and won the Man-of-the-Match award in the sides 23–3 2016–17 Pro12 semi-final victory against Ospreys. On 27 May 2017, Saili made his final appearance for Munster when he started against Scarlets in the 2017 Pro12 Grand Final in the Aviva Stadium, Dublin.

On 21 June 2017, it was announced that Saili had signed for English Premiership side Harlequins. Saili played in his first senior game after recovering from an injury on 14 October in a European Champions Cup game against French side La Rochelle. He came on as a substitute in a 34–27 loss.

Saili left Harlequins to join French Pro D2 club Biarritz for the 2020–21 season.

References

External links
Harlequins Profile
Munster Profile
Blues Profile
North Harbour Profile
itsrugby.co.uk Profile
ESPN Profile

Living people
1991 births
New Zealand rugby union players
New Zealand sportspeople of Samoan descent
New Zealand international rugby union players
Auckland rugby union players
North Harbour rugby union players
Blues (Super Rugby) players
Rugby union centres
People educated at St Peter's College, Auckland
Rugby union players from Auckland
Munster Rugby players
Harlequin F.C. players
Biarritz Olympique players
New Zealand expatriate rugby union players
New Zealand expatriate sportspeople in France
Expatriate rugby union players in France
New Zealand expatriate sportspeople in England
Expatriate rugby union players in England
New Zealand expatriate sportspeople in Ireland
Expatriate rugby union players in Ireland